The Treaty of Kortrijk (Dutch: Verdrag van Kortrijk) was signed the 28 March 1820 in the current Museum of Arts Broelmuseum in the Belgian city of Kortrijk. This treaty laid out the boundaries between France and the United Kingdom of the Netherlands (under the reign of King William I of the Netherlands). Belgium inherited the border upon its independence from the Netherlands in 1830. Nowadays, these boundaries still stand, with some minor corrections, as the official boundaries between Belgium and France and between Luxembourg and France.

Prior to the treaty, border markers were set up on the French-Nederland border in 1819. The Treaty stipulates that if a debate on boundaries is needed, a committee of representatives from France and Belgium will discuss it , but meetings have not been held since 1930.

In 2021, the treaty was inadvertently violated when a disgruntled Belgian farmer moved one of the border markers seven feet (2.2 metres) into French territory, enlarging not only his land but the entire country of Belgium. The mayors of the neighbouring French and Belgian villages took the encroachment good-naturedly, and the farmer was issued with a letter ordering that the stone be moved back to its original position.

See also
 Congress of Vienna (1814/15)
 Austrian Netherlands

References

1820 in France
United Kingdom of the Netherlands
Treaties of the United Kingdom of the Netherlands
History of Kortrijk
1820 in the Netherlands
1820 treaties
1820 in Luxembourg